MZK may refer to:
 Marakei Airport, the IATA code MZK
 ISO 639:mzk, the ISO 639 code for the Mambila language